Helsby railway station serves the village of Helsby in Cheshire, England.  It is recorded in the National Heritage List for England as a Grade II listed building.

The station is on the Chester–Warrington line between Chester and Warrington Bank Quay and on the Hooton–Helsby line to Hooton.

Facilities

There is a BT Payphone on Platform 1. Limited seating exists on Platform 1 and 2.

The station has won numerous Best Kept Station awards. A Customer Information System has been installed and is operational.

There is no disabled access to trains calling at this station due to the low platforms. Platforms for the Manchester and Ellesmere Port services can also only be reached by using the footbridge.

The station is operated by Transport for Wales and is unstaffed requiring passengers to purchase tickets from the ticket vending machine located on Platform 1. The nearest station with additional ticketing facilities is Chester. Penalty fares do not operate here. 

From 2005 until the franchise was handed over in 2018 the Helsby station was operated by Arriva Trains Wales.

Services

There is a basic hourly service in each direction between Manchester and Chester/North Wales and between Chester and Liverpool Lime Street via the Halton Curve. There is also a service to Leeds that calls at Helsby three times in a morning and twice in an evening that is operated by Northern. There are two services that run to Holyhead rather than Llandudno on weekdays and one service on Saturdays runs to Bangor. On Sundays the Manchester service operates between Chester & Manchester Piccadilly only, although on the same hourly frequency as during the week.

The station is also the junction of the branch line to Ellesmere Port. This service sees three trains daily in each direction, (Monday–Saturday) - two in the early morning and another in the early evening. Northern Trains operates this service. (In the picture, the train on the right has arrived from Ellesmere Port). There is no Sunday service on this line.

The summer Saturdays only Chester to Runcorn parliamentary train via the Halton Curve (operated by Northern) passed through the station but did not call when operating.  A regular (hourly each way, seven days a week) service between Liverpool Lime Street and Chester on this route, calling here and serving  and  commenced at the May 2019 timetable change.

Liverpool City Region Combined Authority, Long Term Rail Strategy document of October 2017, page 37, states that a trial of new Merseyrail battery trains will be undertaken in 2020, in view to put Helsby onto the Merseyrail network. If successful, Helsby will be one of the terminals of the Wirral line giving direct services to Birkenhead and four underground station in Liverpool's city centre.

Adopt-a-station

The North Cheshire Rail Users' Group has adopted this station and regularly ensure the station is clean and tidy. The station has won the "Best Kept Station" six times, and the plaques commending this are fixed to the signal box located on the island platforms, (2 + 3).

Connections 
Helsby has several bus links operated primarily by Arriva North West and Stagecoach Merseyside.

 Route X30 operates between Chester and Warrington hourly. (Arriva NW) (Monday - Saturday)
 Route X2 operates between Runcorn and Chester via Ince & Elton, and Ellesmere Port, hourly. (Stagecoach Merseyside) (Monday - Saturday)

See also

 Listed buildings in Helsby

References

Further reading

External links 

North Cheshire Rail Users Group User group responsible for upkeep of Helsby station

Railway stations in Cheshire
Grade II listed buildings in Cheshire
Former Birkenhead Railway stations
Railway stations in Great Britain opened in 1852
Northern franchise railway stations
Railway stations served by Transport for Wales Rail
1852 establishments in England
DfT Category F1 stations